"July" is a song by American singer Noah Cyrus, released as the lead single from her second EP The End of Everything through Records and Columbia Records on July 31, 2019. A duet version with American soul singer Leon Bridges was released on November 8, 2019, after which the song became Cyrus' second and Bridges' first entry on the US Billboard Hot 100, peaking at number 85.

Composition
The song features harmonies and "contemplative lyrics" over "simple acoustic instrumentation".

Critical reception
Mike Wass of Idolator described the track as a "country-tinged ballad". Writing for Billboard, Ellise Shafer called it "reflective" and a "folk-infused ballad" about "the continuous cycle of a toxic relationship".

Music video
The music video was directed by James Pereira, Raymond Jafelice, and Andrew Young and released on July 31, the same day as the song.

Charts

Weekly charts

Year-end charts

Certifications

Release history

References

2010s ballads
2019 singles
2019 songs
Leon Bridges songs
Noah Cyrus songs
Songs written by Noah Cyrus
Songs written by Jenna Andrews
Columbia Records singles